Lee Bong-Ju (born November 8, 1970, in Cheonan, Chungcheongnam-do, South Korea) is a South Korean marathoner.

He graduated from University of Seoul then competed for South Korea in the 1996 Summer Olympics held in Atlanta, United States in the Marathon where he won the silver medal.

He set the current South Korean men's national marathon record at 2:07:20 in Tokyo on February 13, 2000, and half marathon at 1:01:04 in Tokyo on January 26, 1992.
He finished 41 marathons for his 19 years career with twice national records.

He retired following his victory at the Korean National Sports Festival in October 2009.

Achievements 

All results regarding marathon, unless stated otherwise

References

External links 
 

1970 births
Living people
South Korean male long-distance runners
Athletes (track and field) at the 1996 Summer Olympics
Athletes (track and field) at the 2000 Summer Olympics
Athletes (track and field) at the 2004 Summer Olympics
Athletes (track and field) at the 2008 Summer Olympics
Olympic athletes of South Korea
Olympic silver medalists for South Korea
Asian Games medalists in athletics (track and field)
Athletes (track and field) at the 1998 Asian Games
Athletes (track and field) at the 2002 Asian Games
Medalists at the 1996 Summer Olympics
Asian Games gold medalists for South Korea
Boston Marathon male winners
Olympic silver medalists in athletics (track and field)
Medalists at the 1998 Asian Games
Medalists at the 2002 Asian Games
South Korean Buddhists
People from Cheonan
University of Seoul alumni